The 1918 Milan–San Remo was the 11th edition of the Milan–San Remo cycle race and was held on 14 April 1918. The race started in Milan and finished in San Remo. The race was won by Costante Girardengo.

General classification

References

1918
1918 in road cycling
1918 in Italian sport
April 1918 sports events